Mesembriomys is a genus of rodent in the family Muridae endemic to Australia. It contains the following species:
 Black-footed tree-rat (M. gouldii)
 Golden-backed tree-rat (M. macrurus)

References

 
Rodent genera
Taxa named by Theodore Sherman Palmer
Taxonomy articles created by Polbot